Elena Paciotti (born Elena Ornella, 9 January 1941) is an Italian politician and magistrate. She was twice president of Magistrates National Association and a Member of the European Parliament for the Democratic Party of the Left.

Since 1999 she has also been a president of the Lelio and Lisli Basso Foundation for the Study of Contemporary Society.

References

External links
 Fondazione Italiani Europei 
 Il Dubbio News 

1941 births
Living people
Politicians from Rome
MEPs for Italy 1999–2004
Italian women judges
20th-century Italian women
21st-century Italian women